Gabrielle Roy  (March 22, 1909July 13, 1983) was a Canadian author from St. Boniface, Manitoba and one of the major figures in French Canadian literature.

Early life
Roy was born in 1909 in Saint-Boniface (now part of Winnipeg), Manitoba, and was educated at the Académie Saint-Joseph. She lived on rue Deschambault, a house and neighbourhood in Saint-Boniface that would later inspire one of her most famous works. The house is now a National Historic Site and museum in Winnipeg.

Career 
After training as a teacher at The Winnipeg Normal School, she taught in rural schools in Marchand and Cardinal and was then appointed to the Institut Collégial Provencher in Saint Boniface.

With her savings she was able to spend some time in Europe, but was forced to return to Canada in 1939 at the outbreak of World War II. She returned with some of her works near completion, but settled in Quebec to earn a living as a sketch artist while continuing to write.

Her first novel, Bonheur d'occasion (1945), gave a starkly realistic portrait of the lives of people in Saint-Henri, a working-class neighbourhood of Montreal. The novel caused many Quebeckers to take a hard look at themselves, and is regarded as the novel that helped lay the foundation for Quebec's Quiet Revolution of the 1960s. The original French version won her the prestigious Prix Femina in 1947. Published in English as The Tin Flute (1947), the book won the 1947 Governor General's Award for fiction as well as the Royal Society of Canada's Lorne Pierce Medal. Distributed in the United States, where it sold more than three-quarters of a million copies, the Literary Guild of America made The Tin Flute a feature book of the month in 1947. The book garnered so much attention that Roy returned to Manitoba to escape the publicity.

There are two French versions of Bonheur d'occasion. The first was published in 1945 by Société des Éditions Pascal in two volumes. This version was translated in 1947 by Hannah Josephson, who removed several short passages from the English version. In 1965, Librairie Beauchemin published an abridged French version eliminating a number of passages. This second version was translated by Alan Brown in 1980. As a result, there has never been an unabridged version of The Tin Flute published in English.

In August 1947, she married Marcel Carbotte, a Saint Boniface doctor, and the couple set off for Europe where Carbotte studied gynecology and Roy spent her time writing.

Where Nests the Water Hen, Gabrielle Roy's second novel, is a sensitive and sympathetic tale that captures both the innocence and the vitality of a sparsely populated frontier.

Another of her novels brought additional critical acclaim. Alexandre Chenevert (1954), is a dark and emotional story that is ranked as one of the most significant works of psychological realism in the history of Canadian literature.

She is considered by many to be one of the most important Francophone writers in Canadian history and one of the most influential Canadian authors. In 1963, she was on a panel that gave the Montreal World's Fair, Expo 67, its theme: Terre des hommes or in English Man and His World. It was her suggestion to use Antoine de Saint-Exupéry's 1939 book title as the organizing theme. In 2016, Margaret Atwood, who had read her books as a teenager, wrote an essay about her career, and noted that her works were still more relevant than ever.

Gabrielle Roy died in 1983 at the age of seventy-four. Her autobiography, La Détresse et l'enchantement, was published posthumously and translated in 1984 by Patricia Claxton, a prominent Quebec translator who is considered the primary translator of Gabrielle Roy's works from French to English. Her translation of Gabrielle Roy's autobiography, translated into English as Enchantment and Sorrow was awarded the Governor General's Award in 1987. The autobiography covers the years from Gabrielle Roy's childhood in Manitoba to the time when she settled in Quebec. The movie Tramp at the Door is dedicated to her and supposedly depicts her childhood. Patricia Claxton won her second Governor General's Award in 1999 for translating François Ricard's biography of Gabrielle Roy.

Awards and recognition

 1946 – La Médaille de l'académie des lettres du Québec
 1947 – Prix Femina for Bonheur d'occasion (The Tin Flute)
 1947 – Governor General's Award for Fiction for The Tin Flute
 1947 – Royal Society of Canada's Lorne Peace Medal for The Tin Flute
 1967 – Companion of the Order of Canada
 1979 – Courte-Queue, book design and illustrations by François Olivier, was awarded the Canada Council Children's Literature Prize (translated by Alan Brown in 1980 as Cliptail).
 2004 – On September 29, 2004, the Bank of Canada issued a $20 bank note in the Canadian Journey Series which included a quotation from her 1961 book The Hidden Mountain (La Montagne secrète), and its English translation by Harry Binsse.
 2007 – Children of My Heart was selected for the 2007 edition of Canada Reads

She won the Governor General's Award three times, the Prix David twice, the Prix Duvernay and the Molson Prize.

The National Library of Canada (now Library and Archives Canada) has preserved a collection of her materials covering the years 1940 to 1983, including manuscripts, typescripts, galleys of published and unpublished works such as La Rivière sans repos, Cet été qui chantait, Un jardin au bout du monde, Ces enfants de ma vie, and La Détresse et l'enchantement, as well as business and personal correspondence, business records, and memorabilia.

Schools and a campus named in her honour
 École/Collège régional Gabrielle-Roy, a French-language combined elementary and high school in Île-des-Chênes, Manitoba, Canada
 École élémentaire publique Gabrielle-Roy, a French-language elementary school in Gloucester, Ontario, Canada
 École Gabrielle-Roy, a French-language elementary school in Toronto, Ontario, Canada
 École Gabrielle-Roy, a French-language combined elementary and high school in Surrey, British Columbia, Canada
 École publique Gabrielle-Roy, a Francophone K-12 school in Edmonton, Alberta, Canada
 Gabrielle-Roy, the main campus of CEGEP de l'Outaouais, a French-language CEGEP (provincial college) in the Province of Québec
 École Gabrielle Roy, a Francophone middle school (gr. 7–8) in Chateauguay, Quebec, Canada

Selected writings

The Tin Flute (Bonheur d'occasion) (1945)
Where Nests the Water Hen (La Petite Poule d'Eau) (1950)
The Cashier (Alexandre Chenevert) (1954)
Street of Riches (Rue Deschambault) (1955)
The Hidden Mountain (La Montagne secrète) (1961)
The Road Past Altamont (La Route d'Altamont) (1966), transl. Joyce Marshall (1913–2005)
Windflower (La Rivière sans repos) (1970), transl. Joyce Marshall 
Enchanted Summer (Cet été qui chantait) (1972), transl. Joyce Marshall
Garden in the Wind (Un jardin au bout du monde) (1975)
My Cow Bossie (Ma vache Bossie) (1976)
Children of My Heart (Ces Enfants de ma vie) (1977)
The Fragile Lights of Earth (Fragiles lumières de la Terre) (1978)
Cliptail (Courte-Queue) (1979)
Enchantment and Sorrow (La Détresse et l'enchantement) (1984)
The Tortoiseshell and the Pekinese (L'Espagnole et la Pékinoise) (1987)

See also
 La Maison Gabrielle Roy (or "The House of Gabrielle Roy") is a museum in the childhood home of Gabrielle Roy (in St. Boniface / Winnipeg, Manitoba, Canada).

References

External links

 Biography in  Dictionary of Canadian Biography online (biographi.ca)
 Order of Canada Citation
 Excerpt from Children of My Heart at CBC Words at Large
 Bank of Canada – Canadian Journey Series, 2004, $20, back: text from "La Montagne secrète"
 Gabrielle Roy exhibit at the Canadian Museum of History
 Gabrielle Roy in The Canadian Encyclopedia
 Gabrielle Roy: An English Canadians' Favorite French Canadian 
 Illustrer les textes pour enfants écrits par Gabrielle Roy in Cahiers Franco-Canadiens de l'Ouest Vol. 16, Nos 1–2, 2005, p. 75-116 
 
 Roy: du manuscript au virtuel, named "Hyperroy", at UQAM
 (French) Fonds Gabrielle Roy et Marcel Carbotte (R11800) at Library and Archives Canada
 (French) Fonds Gabrielle Roy (R11799) at Library and Archives Canada

1909 births
1983 deaths
20th-century Canadian novelists
Companions of the Order of Canada
Fellows of the Royal Society of Canada
Franco-Manitoban people
Governor General's Award-winning fiction writers
People from Saint Boniface, Winnipeg
Prix Femina winners
Writers from Winnipeg
Writers from Quebec
Persons of National Historic Significance (Canada)
Prix Athanase-David winners
Canadian women novelists
Antoine de Saint-Exupéry
20th-century Canadian women writers
Canadian novelists in French
20th-century Canadian non-fiction writers
Canadian women non-fiction writers
Canadian autobiographers
Women autobiographers
Canadian non-fiction writers in French
20th-century letter writers